CLT, Clt, or clt may refer to:

Medicine and healthcare
 Cognitive load theory in cognitive psychology
 Chronic lymphocytic thyroiditis, an autoimmune disease
 Clinical Laboratory Technologist, a healthcare professional
 Clot lysis time, a parameter of the overall hemostatic potential test

Places
 Charlotte Douglas International Airport (IATA airport code: CLT)
 Kozhikode railway station (station code CLT)

Organizations
 Canadian Learning Television, a former name of Oprah Winfrey Network
 Capitol Land Trust, Washington, USA
 Compagnie Luxembourgeoise de Radiodiffusion, later RTL Group, Luxembourg media company
 Culture Commission or  "CLT Commission" affiliated with UNESCO

Other uses
 Central limit theorem, a probability theorem
 Construal level theory, a social statistics theory
 Central location test, a marketing research technique
 Charitable Lead Trust, a type of charitable trust
 Chile Standard Time, a time zone which equals to UTC−4
 Communicative language teaching
 Community land trust
 Cross-laminated timber
 Consolidação das Leis do Trabalho, Portuguese for Consolidation of Labor Laws
 Classic Learning Test
 Cued Language Transliterator, the process of converting a language to a cued language such as sign language.